Jubail (Al Jubayl) is a city in the Eastern province on the Persian Gulf coast of Saudi Arabia, with a total population of 684,531 as of 2021. It is home to the largest industrial city in the world. It is also home to the Middle East's largest and world's fourth largest petrochemical company SABIC. It has the world's largest IWPP (Independent Water and Power Project) producing 2743.6 MW of electricity and 800,000 m3 of water daily. Jubail comprises the Old Town of Al Jubail (Jubail Balad), which was a small fishing village until 1975, and the Industrial Area. Jubail Industrial City is the largest civil engineering project in the world today.

In 1975, the Saudi government designated Jubail as the site for new industrial city, with rapid expansion and industrialization arising. The new industrial and residential areas were named Madīnat al Jubayl aṣ Ṣinā`īyah (Jubail Industrial City). The 2005 Census Report for Jubail Industrial City estimates the population at 224,430 residents.

History

The town of Al-Jubail, on the Arabian Gulf coast of the Kingdom of Saudi Arabia, has ancient roots. Human habitation dates back at least 7,000 years, when the people of Dilmun — whose civilization radiated up and down the coast of the Arabian Gulf — established a settlement there.
Archaeological place: Crease Tower or Tuwayah Tower was constructed around 1928. It was key source of water for Jubail.
In September 1933, Jubail gained a measure of fame as the landing site for the first team of geologists to explore for oil in Saudi Arabia.

Jubail Industrial City 

It is the world's largest industrial city established in 1975. It covers 1,016 square kilometers and includes industrial complexes, major harbour and port facilities. It contributes to about 7% of Saudi Arabia's GDP.

Bechtel began work on the Jubail Industrial City project more than 40 years ago and is still working in Jubail now. Bechtel has managed the Jubail project since it began in the mid-1970s, and in 2004 the Royal Commission for Jubail and Yanbu asked the company to manage Jubail II, a $3.8 billion expansion of the city's industrial and residential areas.

Transportation

Highway
Jubail is directly connected with other cities by two major highways; Dhahran-Jubail Highway and Abu Hadriyah Highway.

Railway
A branch of the Saudi Landbridge Project railway is proposed to connect Jubail to Dammam.

Seaport
There are two seaports in Jubail—the Jubail Commercial Seaport and the King Fahd Industrial Seaport. As of 2011, Jubail ranks 92nd in the world in terms of Total Cargo Volume with 44,700 tons.

Airport
The city is served by King Fahd International Airport.

Jubail Naval Airport is an airfield 25 kilometres (16 mi) west of Jubail City, near the industrial area. Originally constructed by the Royal Commission of Jubail and Yanbu as part of Jubail project, it was meant to be used for commercial aviation until it was decided to utilize the large nearby King Fahd International Airport. Thus, it was handed over to the Ministry of Defence and has been used as a base for the naval aviation group/eastern fleet of the Royal Saudi Navy since then. The terminal in Dammam Airport is about 60 km drive from the suburbs of Jubail, 80 km from the city center and 100 km from the Royal Commission neighborhoods.

However it was recently announced that the airport will be opened for private aviation operations starting September 2014. A project to renovate the airfield was undertaken since some of the airfield's infrastructure was incomplete, as a result of the previous change for the use of airport from commercial to military. To date, the project and renovations have not been completed.

In addition, two other airfields are located in the city; Abu Ali Airport is located in the Island of Abu Ali while the other is located in King Abdulaziz Naval Base.

Main sights 

Jubail has a robust market place, known as International Market. It also has several malls, such as Fanateer Mall, Galleria Mall, Jubail Center Mall, Fanateer Beach, City Max, Hyper-Panda, Panda, Banana Beach, Jubail Centre, Home Center, Red Tag, Centrepoint, Jalmudah Hills, Jubail Plaza, Jubail RTV Riding Arena and Jubail Mall.

Beaches 
 Jubail Beach  
 Al Jubail Corniche 
 Youth Beach 
 Al Nakheel Beach 
 Fanateer Beach
 Dareen Beach
 Banana Beach

The Jubail desalination plant

As part of the industrial city, Jubail has a desalination plant called Saline Water Conversion Corp. (SWCC). In 2019, SWCC hit Guinness World Record as the largest producer of desalinated water worldwide. The plant hit the record as it produces 5.6 million cubic meters every day.

Education

Schools 

 Al Abna'a Schools
 Mariya international School
 Al Moattasem International School
 Hafeez International School
 International Indian School, Al- Jubail (IIS Jubail)
 ISG Jubail
 Jubail Academy International School
 King Fahd High School
 Pakistan International School

 Al Murjan Elementary School
 Al Ahsa Secondary School
 Andalus Elementary School
 Dana Elementary School
 Fanatir Elementary School
 Fayha Elementary School 
 Khaleeg Intermediate School 

 Al Deffi Secondary School
 Najd Secondary School
 Umm Alqurra Secondary School

Universities and colleges

 Jubail Industrial College
 Jubail Technical Institute
 Jubail University College

Hospitals, dispensaries and dental centers

 Al Fanateer Hospital
 Al-Fayadh Medical Clinic
 Al-Hijailan Medical Clinic
 Al-Khonaini Dispensary
 Al-Shabani General Hospital
 Al-Shifa Hospital
 Almana General Hospital
 Almana Medical Center
 Al Naba Medical Complex
 Ar Razi Clinic
 Armed Forces Hospital
 Badr Al Khaleej Medical Center
 Danat Al Sahraa Medical Company (KIMS)
 Dina Dispensary for Medical Services
 Huda Younis Dental Complex
 Jubail General Hospital
 Jubail Medical Center (Mutlaq Al Otaibi Medical Service Group)
 Jubail National Dispensary
 KIMS Medical Center
 Kingdom Dental Medical Dispensary
 Lulu Dispensary
 Lulu Hospital
 Mayo Dental Center
 Mouwasat Hospital
 Ram Dental Complex
 Royal Commission Hospital

Distances to nearby places

Eastern Province
 Safwa city: 
 Qatif: 
 Ras Tanura: 
 Saihat: 
 Dammam: 
 Khobar: 
 Abqaiq: 
 Al-Ahsa:

Other provinces
 Riyadh: 
 Buraydah: 
 Arar: 
 Ha'il: 
 Medina: 
 Mecca: 
 Jeddah:

Other cities of Eastern Arabia
  Manama: 
  Kuwait City: 
  Doha: 
  Abu Dhabi: 
  Dubai: 
  Muscat:

Climate
Jubail has a hot desert climate (Köppen climate classification BWh).

See also 

 List of cities and towns in Saudi Arabia

References

External links 

 Royal Commission for Jubail and Yanbu
 Jubail City - Article about master planning the Jubail New Industrial City
 Jubail directory
 www.worldatlas.com
 zeenews.india.com

 
Populated places in Eastern Province, Saudi Arabia
Port cities and towns in Saudi Arabia